Bridgette Leann Wilson Sampras (born September 25, 1973) is a former American actress, singer, model, and Miss Teen USA award winner. Wilson began her career as an actress after being crowned  Miss Teen USA in 1990, playing the character of Lisa Fenimore on the soap opera Santa Barbara from April 1992 to January 1993.

She appeared in a number of films, including Last Action Hero (1993) in her movie debut, Higher Learning (1995), Mortal Kombat (1995), and Billy Madison (1995). She later had roles in I Know What You Did Last Summer (1997), House on Haunted Hill (1999), The Wedding Planner (2001), and Shopgirl (2005).

Early life
Wilson was born and raised in the small coastal town of Gold Beach, Oregon, United States, the daughter of Kathy and Dale Wilson. While in high school, she competed on the school's volleyball team. She was crowned Miss Teen USA in 1990 at the age of 17 in Biloxi, Mississippi, and was the second contender from Oregon to win the crown. She graduated from Gold Beach High School in 1991.

Career
After her reign as Miss Teen USA, Wilson became an actress and appeared in Santa Barbara, Ginger on Saved By The Bell, Last Action Hero (as Jack Slater's daughter Whitney), Higher Learning (cameo as a university student), Billy Madison (playing Adam Sandler's character's teacher/girlfriend Veronica Vaughn), Mortal Kombat (playing Sonya Blade), Nixon (a cameo as a nightclub performer), I Know What You Did Last Summer (as Sarah Michelle Gellar's ill-fated elder sister), House on Haunted Hill (as Melissa Marr), Buying the Cow, The Suburbans, Love Stinks, Nevada, Sweet Evil (as a psychopathic surrogate mother), Extreme Ops (as a world-champion skier), and The Wedding Planner. Wilson also appeared on an episode of CSI: Miami as a woman whose husband is killed by a package delivered to their house. Wilson’s last film role before retiring from acting would be Phantom Punch (2008).

Wilson has starred in The Rocky Horror Show (off-Broadway) and was a judge on the 2006 Miss Universe competition. Wilson is also a singer and was featured on Tommy Shane Steiner's debut album Then Came the Night, performing a spoken-word part in "What We're Gonna Do About It". This song reached number 43 on the Billboard Hot Country Songs charts in 2002.

Personal life
Wilson married professional tennis player, Pete Sampras on September 30,  2000 after dating for nine months. On November 21, 2002, their son, Christian Charles Sampras, was born. On July 29, 2005, the couple had their second son, Ryan Nikolaos Sampras. The family resides in Lake Sherwood, California.

Filmography

Discography

Albums

Guest singles

References

External links

1973 births
20th-century American actresses
21st-century American actresses
Actresses from Oregon
American child actresses
American child models
American women country singers
American country singer-songwriters
Female models from Oregon
American film actresses
American soap opera actresses
American television actresses
Living people
1990 beauty pageant contestants
20th-century Miss Teen USA delegates
Miss Teen USA winners
People from Gold Beach, Oregon
Singer-songwriters from Oregon
Country musicians from Oregon
21st-century American singers
21st-century American women singers